Aleksei Müürisepp (17 July 1902, Välta, Kreis Ösel, Governorate of Livonia – 7 October 1970, Tartu) was a Soviet Estonian politician.

1961–1970, he was the chairmen of the Presidium of the Supreme Soviet of the Estonian Soviet Socialist Republic.

References

1902 births
1970 deaths
People from Saaremaa Parish
People from Kreis Ösel
Members of the Central Committee of the Communist Party of Estonia
Central Committee of the Communist Party of the Soviet Union candidate members
Heads of state of the Estonian Soviet Socialist Republic
Heads of government of the Estonian Soviet Socialist Republic
People's commissars and ministers of the Estonian Soviet Socialist Republic
Members of the Supreme Soviet of the Estonian Soviet Socialist Republic, 1947–1951
Members of the Supreme Soviet of the Estonian Soviet Socialist Republic, 1951–1955
Members of the Supreme Soviet of the Estonian Soviet Socialist Republic, 1955–1959
Members of the Supreme Soviet of the Estonian Soviet Socialist Republic, 1959–1963
Members of the Supreme Soviet of the Estonian Soviet Socialist Republic, 1963–1967
Members of the Supreme Soviet of the Estonian Soviet Socialist Republic, 1967–1971
Fourth convocation members of the Supreme Soviet of the Soviet Union
Fifth convocation members of the Supreme Soviet of the Soviet Union
Sixth convocation members of the Supreme Soviet of the Soviet Union
Seventh convocation members of the Supreme Soviet of the Soviet Union
Eighth convocation members of the Supreme Soviet of the Soviet Union
Recipients of the Order of Lenin
Recipients of the Order of the Red Banner of Labour
Recipients of the Order of the Red Star
Burials at Metsakalmistu